Siddu is a 2005 Indian Kannada-language action drama film directed by Mahesh Sukhadhare and starring Murali and Deepu. This film is about the land mafia in Bangalore. The film was a box office failure. The film is inspired by the German film Run Lola Run (1998).

Cast 
Murali as Siddu
Deepu as Anjali
Akhilendra Mishra as Range Gowda
H. G. Dattatreya as Siddu's teacher
Tara
 Kudavalli Chandrashekhar
Avinash
Sharan

Production 
Murali signed the film before completing his previous film Yashwanth (2003). He did all the stunts himself. A chase sequence was shot in Bangalore. Hindi actor Akhilendra Mishra stars in the film. In the climax, Deepu carries a bag containing 1000-rupee notes amounting up to three crore rupees. The makers of the film received backlash since the 1000-rupee note was worth only 2 rupees in the black market.

Reception 
A critic from Rediff.com wrote that "For Murali fans, this is good stuff. For others, still very well presented fare". A critic from Viggy wrote that "In a nutshell, Siddu is a film that doesn't test your patience for sure and lives up to the expectations". A critic from Indiaglitz wrote that "Siddhu is well narrated film. You will enjoy seeing this film. For Murali fans it is a bonanza".

References 

2000s Kannada-language films
2000s masala films
2005 action films
2005 films